Wei Baogui (born 20 March 1990) is a Chinese handball player for Guangdong and the Chinese national team.

She participated at the 2017 World Women's Handball Championship.

References

1990 births
Living people
Chinese female handball players